Revue de Paris was a French literary magazine founded in 1829 by Louis-Désiré Véron. After two years Veron left the magazine to head the Paris Opera.

The magazine ceased to be published in 1970.

References

External links
 WorldCat record

1829 establishments in France
1970 disestablishments in France
Defunct literary magazines published in France
French-language magazines
Magazines established in 1829
Magazines disestablished in 1970
Magazines published in Paris